An Armenian name comprises a given name and a surname.

First names
According to Armenia's National Statistical Service, the  most commonly used names for newborn boys in Armenia, were Davit, Narek, Gor, Hayk, Alex, Erik, Arman, Samvel, Tigran, and Aram. For girls, the most popular names were Nare, Milena, Mane, Ani, Anna, Anahit, Mariam, Elen, and Mary.

Traditionally, Armenians have used Biblical names of Greek, Latin and Hebrew origin, such as Abraham, Hakob (Jacob), Hovhannes (John), Petros (Peter), Poghos (Paul), Madlene (Magdalene), Yeghisabet (Elizabeth), Tamar, etc.

Surnames
Typical modern Armenian last names (family names) end with the originally patronymic suffix -յան (reformed orthography) or -եան (classical orthography), transliterated as -yan, -ian,  or less often '-jan'. Example: Petrosyan, meaning "issued from Petros", akin to the English name Peterson. Some Armenian last names bear the suffix -նց ([nʦʰ]), transliterated as -nc, -nts or -ntz (as in Bakunts or Adontz), or in addition to -yan/-ian (as in Parajaniants), although that is not common.

Some Armenian surnames have a suffix -լի ([li]) preceding the -յան/-եան suffix.  For example, Sivaslian and Vanlian refer to the cities of Sivas and Van, respectively. Other Armenian surnames have a suffix -ճի ([ʤi] or [ʧi]), transliterated as -ji/dji or -chi/tchi, preceding the -յան/-եան suffix. Names such as Kebabjian and Kahvejian refer to kebab and coffee merchants, respectively. While the -եան suffix already existed in the Classical Armenian period (e.g. Արտաշեսեան Artashesian, Մամիկոնեան Mamikonian), other suffixes, now rarer, also existed. The suffix -ունի (as in Բագրատունի Bagratuni, Արշակունի Arshakuni, [uni]) had a similar meaning to -եան.

The suffix -ցի ([tsʰi]) denoted a geographical provenance, e.g. Movses Khorenatsi (from Khoren) and Anania Shirakatsi (from Shirak).

The prefix Տեր ([ter]), which comes from how one addresses a priest, is typically Armenian. It might be followed by a space or attached directly to the root. If someone possesses a surname containing "Der" or "Ter" it usually signifies that this person has a patrilineal ancestor who was a priest.

Roots of names 
The roots of names ending with -ian/-yan are typically first names, such as Petrosian "issued from Petros", Simonian "issued from Simon", etc. When the name ends in -lian or -(d)jian, the root is expected to refer to a location or a profession, respectively. Thus, the etymology of Vanlian is literally "issued from the man from Van" and that of Kebabjian is "issued from the kebab merchant". However, an ancestor's occupation will not necessarily contain the suffix -(d)ji, thus Vardapetian/Vartabedian (Վարդապետյան/-եան) translates as "issued from the vardapet", Bjishkian (Բժիշկյան/-եան) as "issued from the doctor" and Keshishian (Քեշիշյան/-եան) as "issued from the priest".

The -ian/-yan suffix may also, but more rarely, attach to an adjective denoting a quality. Thus, Bzdigian/Pztikian (Պզտիկյան/-եան) translates as "issued from the small (man)", Medzian/Metsian (Մեծյան/-եան) as "issued from the tall (man)", Ganantchian/Kanantchian (Կանանչյան/-եան) as "issued from the green, i.e. young (man)".

Some former noble Armenian names, such as Artsruni/Ardzruni (Արծրունի) are still in use today. When they moved from Armenia or from the Middle East, some changed their last names to adapt better to their new societies. Sometimes the -ian or -yan ending was dropped and the root kept, such as Charles Aznavour (was Aznavourian), or Andy Serkis (originally Sarkissian). Other times the name was translated, as "Tashjian" (which is derived from Turkish word 'taş' meaning 'stone') becoming (approximately) "Stone".

Armenian surnames that are of Hebrew origin include Abrahamian/Aprahamian "issued from Abraham", Movsesian "issued from Moses", and Kohanian, derived from Kohen.

Common Armenian surnames

Abrahamyan
Adamyan
Aleksanyan
Arakelyan
Arshakyan
Arzumanyan
Aslanyan
Avagyan
Avetisyan
Babayan
Boyadjian
Badalyan
Baghdasaryan
Barseghyan
Danielyan
Darbinyan
Davtyan
Demirdjian
Gabrielyan
Galstyan
Gasparyan
Gevorgyan
Gharibyan
Ghazaryan
Ghukasyan
Grigoryan
Hakobyan
Hambardzumyan
Harutyunyan
Hayrapetyan
Hovhannisyan
Hovsepyan
Karapetyan
Khachatryan
Kirakosyan
Kocharyan
Manukyan
Margaryan
Martirosyan
Melkonyan
Mikayelyan 
Minasyan
Mirzoyan
Mkhitaryan
Mkrtchyan
Mnatsakanyan
Muradyan
Nazaryan
Nersisyan     
Ohanyan
Petrosyan
Poghosyan
Safaryan
Sahakyan
Samvelyan
Sargsyan
Setrakian
Shahinyan
Simonyan 
Soghomonyan
Stepanyan
Timuryan
Tonoyan
Torosyan
Tovmasyan
Vardanyan
Voskanyan
Yeghiazaryan
Yesayan
Zakaryan

References

External links
 549 Armenian Names For Boys
 215 Armenian Names For Girls